The Battle of Balanjar was a battle that took place during the First Khazar-Arab War between the armies of the Khazar Khaganate and the Caliphate, whose commanding general was Abd ar-Rahman ibn Rabiah.

According to the Arab chroniclers, the Arabs captured Derbent in 642, when Abd al-Rahman ibn Rabiah secured the surrender of the Persian governor of Derbent, Shahrbaraz. Based at Derbent, Abd al-Rahman led frequent raids against the Khazars over the following years, but these were small-scale affairs, and no event of major note is recorded in the sources.

In 652, despite the orders of Caliph Uthman to avoid risks, Abd al-Rahman led a major invasion north, targeting the city of Balanjar. According to Baladhuri and Ya'qubi, however, it was his brother Salman ibn Rabiah who led the invasion.

In the subsequent siege, both sides made use of catapults and ballistae. After several days, the Khazar garrison launched a sortie, which coincided with the arrival of a large Khazar relief army. After Abd al-Rahman was killed, the Arabs collapsed, despite the efforts of his brother, Salman, to rally them. 4,000 Arabs were killed, many fled to Derbent with Salman, while others had to conduct a fighting retreat all the way to Gilan and Jurjan. 

Abd al-Rahman's body was left behind. The Khazars reportedly kept it in a cauldron and venerated it, claiming that it could be used to bring rain or drought, and ensured victory in war.

See also
Battle of Balanjar (disambiguation)

References

Sources
 
 

Balanjar 652
Balanjar 652
Balanjar
Balanjar 652
652
History of the North Caucasus